Andrey Melnichenko may refer to:

Andrey Melnichenko (industrialist) (born 1972), Russian industrialist and philanthropist
Andrey Melnichenko (skier) (born 1992), Russian cross-country skier